Sarah Joseph OBE was CEO and Editor of the bygone Muslim lifestyle magazine emel and a commentator on British Muslims. She converted to Islam at the age of 16 in 1988 after being brought up as a Catholic.

Recognition
Joseph was awarded an OBE in 2004 for services to "interfaith dialogue and the promotion of women's rights".

In 2010 she was listed as one of the world's 500 most influential Muslims by Georgetown University's The Prince Al-Waleed Bin Talaal Center for Muslim-Christian Understanding and Royal Islamic Strategic Studies Centre of Jordan; and in 2006 as one of the UK's 100 most powerful Muslims in the Muslim Power 100 by Carter Anderson.

References

External links
emel Media Ltd.
Interview: Sarah Joseph, Emel magazine  David Rowan, Evening Standard Wednesday 20 July 2005
"Putting a good glossy on the Muslim lifestyle" Stuart Wavell, The Sunday Times 9 October 2005
Sarah Joseph, A British Activist Who Converted to Islam  IslamOnline.net
"A Narrative of Justice for All": Editor of Muslim Lifestyle Magazine Emel on the Life of Prophet Muhammad Heather Martin Durkaya, lastprophet.info 11 December 2010

1971 births
Living people
Alumni of King's College London
Converts to Islam from Roman Catholicism
English Muslims
English magazine editors
English former Christians
Women magazine editors
English women journalists
Officers of the Order of the British Empire
Journalists from London